Eugene may refer to:

People and fictional characters 
 Eugene (given name), including a list of people and fictional characters with the given name
 Eugene (actress) (born 1981), Kim Yoo-jin, South Korean actress and former member of the singing group S.E.S.
 Eugene (wrestler), professional wrestler Nick Dinsmore
 Gene Eugene, stage name of Canadian born actor, record producer, engineer, composer and musician Gene Andrusco (1961–2000)
 Wendell Eugene (1923–2017), American jazz musician

Places

Canada 
 Mount Eugene, in Nunavut; the highest mountain of the United States Range on Ellesmere Island

United States 
 Eugene, Oregon, a city
 Eugene, OR Metropolitan Statistical Area
 Eugene (Amtrak station)
 Eugene Apartments, NRHP-listed apartment complex in Portland, Oregon
 Eugene, Indiana, an unincorporated town
 Eugene, Missouri, an unincorporated town

Business 
 Eugene Green Energy Standard, or EUGENE, an international standard to which electricity labelling schemes can be accredited to confirm that they provide genuine environmental benefits
 Eugene Group, a Korean chaebol
 Eugen Systems, a gaming company located in France
 Eugene Textile Center, a fiber arts studio, retail outlet and educational center in Eugene, Oregon

Literature 
 the protagonist of Eugene Onegin, an 1833 novel in verse written by Aleksandr Pushkin
 Eugene trilogy, a collection of plays by Neil Simon

Fictional characters 
 Eugene (Pokémon) or Eusine, a character in Pokémon
 a character in the Nickelodeon program Hey Arnold!
 Eugene Porter, a character in The Walking Dead franchise

Music 
 the title character of Eugene Onegin (opera), an 1879 opera by Tchaikovsky
 Eugene (1989), an album by Anthony Braxton 
 "Eugene", a song by Arlo Parks, 2020
 "Eugene", a song from the 2006 album The Evening Call by Greg Brown
 "Eugene", a song from the 2015 album Carrie & Lowell by Sufjan Stevens

Storms 
 March 2017 North American blizzard, also known as Blizzard Eugene
 Hurricane Eugene, several storms

Other uses 
 Eugene Ballet, an American ballet company based in Eugene, Oregon
 USS Eugene (PF-40), a 1943 frigate

See also 
 HMS Prince Eugene (1915), a British monitor
 
 Saint Eugene (disambiguation)
 Eugenia (disambiguation)